Quintorigo is an Italian band founded in 1996 by John de Leo, who left the band in 2005. Their genre vary from experimental, jazz, reggae, pop and rock music. Although the musical ensemble is composed only by acoustic instruments, the band often makes heavy use of sound effects like distortion, flanging and wah-wah. They won the Mia Martini critics award at Sanremo Festival in 1999.

Band members
Andrea Costa - violin
Gionata Costa - cello
Stefano Ricci - double bass
Valentino Bianchi - saxophone

Former members
John De Leo - vocals, left the group in 2005
Luisa Cottifogli - vocals, left the group in 2009
Luca Sapio - vocals, left the group in 2012

Discography

Albums
 Rospo (1999)
 Grigio (2001)
 In Cattività (2003)
 Il Cannone (2006)
 Quinto (2006)
 Play Mingus (2008)
 English Garden (2011)
 Quintorigo Experience (2012)
 Around Zappa (2015)

Singles
 Bentivoglio Angelina (2001)

Live recordings
 Nel Vivo (2004)

References

External links
 Official website

Italian rock music groups
Experimental musical groups
Italian jazz ensembles
Musical groups established in 1996
Italian jazz musicians